Saratok may refer to:
Saratok
Saratok District
Saratok (federal constituency), represented in the Dewan Rakyat